Melton Andrew Hawkins (born January 21, 1960) is an American former professional baseball pitcher and coach. Hawkins spent most of his Major League Baseball (MLB) career with the San Diego Padres, and also played for the New York Yankees and briefly for the Oakland Athletics.

Baseball career

San Diego Padres 
He is known for being the only San Diego Padres pitcher to win a World Series game.  Hawkins earned a victory pitching in relief in Game 2 of the 1984 World Series, which the Padres lost to Detroit in five games, though he was the losing pitcher in the fifth and final game. His best season was 1985, when he threw a career-high 228 innings, compiled an 18–8 record (winning his first 11 starts), and finished with a 3.15 ERA. Hawkins is the first pitcher to win his first ten starts since the advent of divisional play in Major League Baseball which started in 1969. His 18 no decisions in 1986 were the most among MLB starting pitchers for that season.

New York Yankees 
After six seasons in San Diego, Hawkins became a free agent after the 1988 season and signed a three-year contract with the New York Yankees in December 1988. This created big expectations for him, heightened when Yankee manager Dallas Green pronounced Hawkins the staff "anchor". Hawkins was the Yankees' most consistent starter in 1989, compiling a 15–15 record, a 4.80 ERA and an American League-leading 111 earned runs surrendered in 208 innings pitched. Tommy John thought Hawkins "would have been much better coming in not as a savior but simply as just another starting pitcher."

In the following year, Hawkins struggled for a very poor Yankees team.  On May 8, with just one win and an ERA of 8.56, Hawkins was offered his outright release, which he accepted, although an injury that night to pitcher Mike Witt changed his mind. Hawkins pitched much better in his next three starts, although he still had only a 1–4 record three months into the season.

Hawkins allowed no hits while pitching a complete game but lost a 4–0 decision to the Chicago White Sox in the Yankees' final appearance at Comiskey Park on July 1, 1990. He retired both Ron Karkovice and Scott Fletcher on infield pop-outs to second baseman Steve Sax to start the eighth inning before Sammy Sosa reached first base safely on a fielding error by third baseman Mike Blowers. After Hawkins walked Ozzie Guillén and Lance Johnson to load the bases, the White Sox scored three unearned runs when a wind-aided ball hit by Robin Ventura glanced off left fielder Jim Leyritz's glove for a two-base error. The last run of the inning resulted from right fielder Jesse Barfield misplaying a ball hit by Iván Calderón by losing it in the sun and dropping it for another two-base error.

Major League Baseball does not consider this effort an official no-hitter, because Hawkins only completed eight innings pitched. On September 4, 1991, the Committee for Statistical Accuracy, appointed by commissioner Fay Vincent, changed the definition of a no-hitter to require that a pitcher must throw at least nine full innings and a complete game for the no-hitter to be official. Since Hawkins played for the visiting team, the White Sox never batted in the ninth inning, meaning Hawkins lost credit for a no-hitter. The game was also notable for being a double no-hitter into the sixth inning (and a double perfect game into the fifth), as White Sox starter Greg Hibbard retired the first 16 batters he faced before Bob Geren reached base on an infield single in the sixth.

In his next appearance on July 6, he faced the Minnesota Twins at Yankee Stadium in the opening game of a doubleheader. Hawkins pitched a shutout into the twelfth inning but wound up losing 2–0. Since then, no starting pitcher has pitched in an MLB game into the twelfth inning or later.

In his following appearance on July 12 in the Bronx, the Yankees lost a six-inning no-hitter to Mélido Pérez and the White Sox. Likewise, that game is not considered an official no-hitter, as the game was shortened to seven innings due to rain; Hawkins was still on the mound when the game was delayed, and then called off. Hawkins's worst month of his career was capped off with his worst start of the season, at home on July 17 against the Kansas City Royals. Hawkins labored through 4 innings and surrendered eight runs on the strength of four homeruns, including three by Bo Jackson, and took the loss in a 10-7 Kansas City victory. Hawkins finished 1990 with a 5–12 record and a 5.37 ERA in 157 innings pitched.

Hawkins started off the 1991 season poorly as well, appearing in four games and going 0–2 before being taken out of the rotation, giving up 14 earned runs in 12 innings. The Yankees released Hawkins on May 9, two days after he lasted only 2 innings and surrendered four earned runs and five hits (including two homeruns) to the California Angels on May 7 in Anaheim. He signed with the Oakland Athletics more than a week later; he compiled a 4–4 record with a 4.79 ERA in 77 innings before the Athletics released him in mid-August. In what would be his final major league appearance on August 4 against the Twins in Oakland Hawkins faced only one batter, striking out Scott Leius swinging.

In his three seasons in the American League, Hawkins also struggled mightily while pitching in Fenway Park. In three career starts there against the Boston Red Sox, Hawkins managed a total of just one inning, giving up 18 earned runs.

Coaching
Hawkins was the bullpen coach of the Texas Rangers, having served as the interim pitching coach following the firing of previous pitching coach Mark Connor during the 2008 season.  Before being promoted as the interim coach, Hawkins was the pitching coach for the Oklahoma RedHawks. At the end of the 2015 season Hawkins left the Rangers.  In 2016 Hawkins was hired on as the pitching coach for the Kansas City Royals AAA team, the Omaha Storm Chasers.

References

External links

1960 births
Living people
Amarillo Gold Sox players
American expatriate baseball players in Canada
Baseball coaches from Texas
Baseball players from Texas
Calgary Cannons players
Hawaii Islanders players
Las Vegas Stars (baseball) players
Major League Baseball bullpen coaches
Major League Baseball pitchers
Major League Baseball pitching coaches
Minor league baseball coaches
New York Yankees players
Oakland Athletics players
Reno Silver Sox players
San Diego Padres players
Sportspeople from Waco, Texas
Texas Rangers coaches
Walla Walla Padres players